Johannes Gezelius is the name shared by three Finnish bishops:

Johannes Gezelius the elder (1615–1690), bishop of Turku 1664–1690 
Johannes Gezelius the younger (1647–1718), bishop of Turku 1690–1718 
 Johannes Gezelius the youngest (1686–1733), Bishop of Porvoo 1721–1733